Roma Tiburtina is the second largest railway station in Rome, after Roma Termini. Located in the north-eastern part of the city, it was originally constructed during the 1860s as a terminal station. In recent years, the station has been redeveloped to better serve as a hub for the Italian high-speed rail services. The station is connected to Rome's Metro line B at Tiburtina metro station, as well as to local bus services via an adjacent bus depot while private vehicle users are provided with more than 100,000 spaces across multiple on-site car parks.

Roma Tiburtina was originally opened in 1866, only three years after the first (temporary) Roma Termini. It was originally known as Portonaccio station, but all usage of this name has since been depreciated. During the 1930s, work was undertaken to expand the station, this included the development of a new main building. A rebuild was undertaken shortly after the end of the Second World War as a result of damage sustained from aerial bombing missions. During 1990, an adjoining metro station was opened, providing further means of local transit for passengers. Since the late 1990s, Roma Tiburtina station has been managed by Grandi Stazioni, a wholly owned entity of the Italian state railway operator Ferrovie dello Stato Italiane.

Between 2007 and 2011, Roma Tiburtina was subject to an extensive redevelopment programme, during which much of the original station building and infrastructure were demolished and replaced, and new on-site facilities established. A major advantage of the redesigned station in terms of high-speed services is that it is a through station, meaning trains travelling from Turin/Milan to Naples/Salerno do not have any need to turn around. Officially inaugurated in November 2011, the new facility is dedicated to the traditional regional trains and to the high-speed rail services on the Milan-Naples line. The new station is expected to reach a daily ridership of over 450,000 by 2015. The station is served by 140 high-speed trains and 290 regional trains every day.

History

Construction and early operations

What would later become known as Roma Tiburtina station was first opened in 1866, only three years after the opening of Rome's first major railway station, Roma Termini. Located in the eastern portion of the city, the station was one of the largest railway stations to have ever been constructed in Italy. During its early years, the station was originally known as Portonaccio.

During the 1930s, it was decided to expand the station via the construction of a new main building. 
On 18 October 1943, two days after the Raid of the Ghetto of Rome, about 1035 Jews were brought to Tiburtina station,  loaded onto Holocaust trains and deported to Auschwitz concentration camp.

As a result of repeated aerial bombardments of Rome during the Second World War, the station suffered extensive damage, including to the recently completed main building. Accordingly, this building would be later rebuilt, albeit in a simplified configuration, during the immediate post-war years. Since the late 1990s, Roma Tiburtina station has been managed by Grandi Stazioni, a wholly owned entity of the Italian state railway operator Ferrovie dello Stato Italiane. While Roma Tiburtina station is regarded as being a heavily trafficked transit hub, even greater passenger numbers have been recorded at the more centrally located Termini.

In October 2003, Sally Baldwin, a visiting British University professor, was killed at the station when an escalator fell apart and a hole suddenly appeared beneath her feet. A local train driver, 38, who had attempted to rescue her also lost a leg; a third person was also seriously injured from falling into the mechanism. An inquiry was launched the next day by local magistrates into the incident; the escalator had been subject to  recent maintenance work and safeguards intended to prevent its activation did not apparently work.

Redeveloped station
During summer 2004, it was announced that plans were prepared for a major upgrade of the station; a major goal of the renovations and redevelop work was to properly establish Roma Tiburtina as a capable transport hub for the expanding Italian high speed rail services. At this point, work was scheduled to commence in 2007 and the project was expected to have a total cost of €155 million. The project was only one element of the wider Trans-European Transport Network initiative conducted by the European Union. The redeveloped station was designed by architect Paolo Desideri, while the responsibility for managing both the design and construction phases resided with the Gemmo Railway Division, which also administered electrical and mechanical systems as well as the project's technical and financial aspects. During December 2007, demolition of the old station building commenced.

As designed, the new Roma Tiburtina takes the form of a large bridge spanning across the railway lines and connecting between the Nomentano and Pietralata districts. It is an enclosed glazed parallelepiped structure, with a length of 240 metres, a width of 50 metres, and suspended 9 metres above ground level. The interior space is divided into eight separate rooms suspended from the roof. The suspension of the main structure offers several advantages, including a greater level of isolation from the noise and vibration generated by the passage of trains beneath it. The ground level platforms are connected to the suspended rooms above via an assortment of 29 escalators and 52 elevators.

The local railway infrastructure was also extensively changed, a total of 20 new high speed and high capacity tracks were laid in the station area, along with improvements to security systems and miscellaneous passenger-facing service infrastructure. The adjacent squares located at either side of the entrances to the station were intentionally developed to accommodate various new areas, including a railway office, a new metro line, a bus terminal, a shopping centre, offices and parking spaces; reportedly, in excess of 100,000 parking spaces were added along with various private access roads. By December 2010, the northern tracks and rail yard had been fully constructed and associated control equipment installed in a centralised traffic control center.

In the early hours of 24 July 2011, a fire broke out in the relay room on the west side of the station. As a result, serious and unavoidable disruption to services occurred, including a temporary partial closure of Metro line B, between Castro Pretorio and Monti Tiburtini. The fire damaged equipment within the relay room, rendering the majority of controls for nearby tracks and traffic signals alike unusable, leaving a vital part of the Italian rail network disabled; reportedly, this led to significant train delays throughout the country. Furthermore, the damage to the structure had reportedly rendered the station building in danger of collapse; due to the impact of the fire, further problems and service delays that occurred for many months afterwards were attributed to the accident.

On 28 November 2011, following three years of construction work, the new station was officially inaugurated and dedicated to Cavour. By the end of the project, the total construction costs had almost doubled from the original projected figure to around €330 million. It is believed that roughly 13,400 tonnes of steel and 95,000 cubic metres of concrete was used during the station's construction. The completed station is expected to handle around 300,000 passengers per day.

Train services

The station is served by the following services (incomplete):

High speed services (Frecciarossa) Turin - Milan - Bologna - Florence - Rome - Naples - Salerno
High speed services (Italo) Turin - Milan - Bologna - Florence - Rome - Naples - Salerno
High speed services (Frecciarossa) Venice - Padua - Bologna - Florence - Rome - Naples - Salerno
High speed services (Italo) Venice - Padua - Bologna - Florence - Rome - Naples - Salerno
High speed services (Frecciargento) Trieste - Venice - Padua - Bologna - Florence - Rome
High speed services (Frecciargento) Udine - Treviso - Venice - Padua - Bologna - Florence - Rome
High speed services (Frecciargento) Venice - Padua - Bologna - Florence - Rome
High speed services (Frecciargento) Venice - Padua - Bologna - Florence - Rome - Fiumicino Airport
Intercity services Milan - Parma - Bologna - Florence - Rome - Naples
Night train (Intercity Notte) Turin - Milan - Parma - Rome - Naples - Salerno
Night train (Intercity Notte) Turin - Milan - Parma - Florence - Rome - Salerno - Lamezia Terme - Reggio di Calabria
Night train (Intercity Notte) Turin - Milan - Bologna - Florence - Rome - Naples - Salerno - Lamezia Terme - Reggio di Calabria
Regional services (Treno regionale) Orte - Fara Sabina - Rome - Fiumicino Airport
Regional services (Treno regionale) Rome - La Rustica - Funghezza - Guidonia - Tivoli
Regional services (Treno regionale) Rome - Cesano di Roma
Regional services (Treno regionale) Rome - Tivoli - Celano - Pratola Peligna - Pescara
Regional services (Treno regionale) Florence - Montevarchi - Arezzo - Orte - Rome
Regional services (Treno regionale) Ancona - Foligno -Terni - Orte - Rome

Interchanges
  Tiburtina station on Line B on the Rome Metro.
  62 - 71 - 111 - 111F - 120F - 135 - 163 - 168 - 211 - 309 - 409 - 441 - 448 - 490 - 492 - 495 - 545 - 548 - 649 - nMB - n409 - n041 - C2 - C3
  Suburban buses (Cotral)
    Regional trains of Lazio Regional Railways
   Regional train to Rome Fiumicino Airport
  Bus shuttle to Rome Fiumicino Airport and Rome Ciampino Airport

The station also features a large and important bus station that serves both national and international destinations, such as Kyiv.

See also

Roma Termini
Roma Ostiense
History of rail transport in Italy
List of railway stations in Lazio
Rail transport in Italy
Railway stations in Italy
High-speed rail in Italy
Treno Alta Velocità

References

External links

Tiburtina
Railway stations opened in 1866
Rome Q. V Nomentano
Rome Q. XXI Pietralata
1866 establishments in the Papal States
Railway stations in Italy opened in the 19th century